NSSF Mbarara Complex, also Mbarara City House,  is a building in Mbarara, a city in the  Western Region of Uganda. 

The building is owned by the Uganda National Social Security Fund, the largest pension fund in the countries of the East African Community, with assets of nearly USh10 trillion (approx. US$2.6 billion), as of June 2018.

Location
The geographical coordinates of the building are 0°36'36.0"S 30°39'35.0"E (Latitude:-0.610000; Longitude:30.659722).

Overview
Mbarara City House is owned by the Uganda National Social Security Fund (NSSF), who developed the building, between 2017 and 2019. The building houses the NSSF offices in Mbarara and the remaining space is rented out to qualified commercial entities. The complex has surface parking for 40 vehicles.

History
Mbarara City House, is the second NSSF real estate investment outside the capital city of Kampala. It was developed at a cost of USh3.9 billion (approximately US$1.2 million). Other recent real estate investments by the fund include two upscale residential neighborhoods with about 50 houses, worth USh14.9 billion (approx. US$4 million) (Mbuya I and Mbuya II), in Mbuya, a Kampala neighborhood. US$1 million).

See also
 Ankole sub-region

References

External links
 NSSF Opens New Building in Jinja (Video)

Buildings and structures in Uganda
Commercial buildings completed in 2019
2019 establishments in Uganda
Skyscraper office buildings in Uganda